New Year's Eve is a 2002 British short romance independent film. The film was written and directed by Col Spector. New Year's Eve was later included in the 2005 compilation film Stories of Lost Souls.

Plot

A young woman brings out the worst in a group of friends on New Year's Eve.

Cast
 Stephen Mangan as David
 Keira Knightley as Leah
 Philip Herbert as Paul
 Bohdan Poraj as Michael
 Amit Lahav as Matt

Reception
The film received mixed reviews. Angus Wolfe Murray of Eye For Film  gave 4 and half out of 5 stars and said "The production values of Colin Spector's film are terrific, matched by his acerbic script and pin-sharp performances. The problem, if indeed it is a problem, remains the party itself. Sane men would certify themselves rather than stay another minute."

Awards

Notes
The characters of David, Matt, Michael and Paul also appeared in Spector's debut feature film Someone Else, Stephen Mangan portrayed David in both films while different actors played Matt, Michael and Paul.

References

External links

British short films
2000s romance films
Films set in London
Films shot in London
British independent films
2002 short films
2002 films
British romance films
2002 independent films
2000s English-language films
2000s British films
English-language romance films